is a Japanese photographer. She graduated from the Kuwazawa Design School in Tokyo. She lives in Paris, France.

Biography 
Onodera works with large images (some reaching 8 meters) and wants her work to be "tangible." In her series "Portrait of Second-Hand Clothes" Onodera used the clothes from "Christian Boltanski's installation 'Dispersion,' a large pile of used garments meant to evoke death and loss." She has worked in Paris since 1993, and she has had solo exhibits around the world. Institutions that hold her work include: The Getty Museum, the San Francisco Museum of Modern Art, and The Tokyo Metropolitan Museum of Photography.

Awards 
 2001, New Photographer Higashikawa Prize
 2002, Kimura Ihei Award
 2006, Prix Niépce

Publications 
 How to Make a Pearl, Nazraeli Press, 2002
 Transvest, Nazraeli Press, 2004,

References

Also see 
 Nihon shashinka jiten / 328 Outstanding Japanese Photographers. Kyoto: Tankōsha, 2000. .  Despite the English-language alternative title, all in Japanese.

Japanese photographers
1962 births
Living people
Japanese women photographers